Oddur Pétursson (2 July 1931 – 24 May 2018) was an  Icelandic cross-country skier. He competed at the 1952 and 1956 Winter Olympics in 15–30 km events and placed 48–61.

Personal life
Oddur was the brother of cross country skier Gunnar Pétursson who competed at the 1952 Winter Olympics.

Death
Oddur died in Ísafjörður on 24 May 2018, at the age of 87.

References

1931 births
2018 deaths
Oddur Petursson
Cross-country skiers at the 1952 Winter Olympics
Cross-country skiers at the 1956 Winter Olympics
Oddur Petursson
Oddur Petursson
20th-century Icelandic people